This is a list of notable events in country music that took place in the year 1957.

Events
 April — Jimmy Dean hosts his first nationally televised series, a 30-minute daytime variety series airing on CBS named The Jimmy Dean Show. The show has a prime-time run from June to September (as a summer replacement series); the daytime show will run until 1958. This is the first of three country music-oriented series bearing Dean's name and hosting duties.
 June 24 — Billboard terminates its "Most Played C&W in Juke Boxes" chart, leaving just the "Most Played C&W by Jockeys" and "C&W Best Sellers in Stores" charts to gauge a song's popularity.
 November 4 — The Nos. 1 and 2 songs on the Billboard Hot 100, and Billboard's R&B and country charts are identical: Elvis Presley's "Jailhouse Rock" and the Everly Brothers' "Wake Up Little Susie." In addition, the No. 6 hit on the Hot 100 and R&B charts — Jimmie Rodgers' "Honeycomb" — is also climbing the country chart.
 December 11 — Jerry Lee Lewis secretly weds his second cousin, Myra Gale Brown, in Hernando, Tennessee.

Top hits of the year

Number one hits

United States
(as certified by Billboard)

Notes
1^ No. 1 song of the year, as determined by Billboard.
2^ Song dropped from No. 1 and later returned to top spot.
A^ First Billboard No. 1 hit for that artist.
B^ Last Billboard No. 1 hit for that artist.

Note: Several songs were simultaneous No. 1 hits on the separate "Most Played C&W in Juke Boxes," "Most Played C&W by Jockeys" and "C&W Best Sellers in Stores" charts.

Other major hits

Top new album releases 
 Johnny Cash With His Hot and Blue Guitar – Johnny Cash (Sun) debut album

Births 
 January 4 — Patty Loveless, top female vocalist of the late 1980s and 1990s, thanks to her voice combining bluegrass, blues and rock.
 February 19 — Lorianne Crook, radio and television personality, one half of Crook & Chase.
 April 12 — Vince Gill, top male vocalist and prominent member of the new traditionalist movement of the late 1980s/1990s.
 May 2 — Mark Sissel, lead guitarist from the Western Underground.
 July 24 — Pam Tillis, daughter of Mel Tillis and popular female vocalist of the 1990s.
 July 27 – Bill Engvall, comedian and member of Blue Collar Comedy with Jeff Foxworthy, Larry the Cable Guy and Ron White
 August 22 — Holly Dunn, female star and artist who helped popularize country music during the late 1980s/early 1990s (died 2016).
 November 1 — Lyle Lovett, alternative country star.

Deaths
 March 24 — Carson Robison, 66, early C&W singer-songwriter.

References

Further reading
Kingsbury, Paul, "The Grand Ole Opry: History of Country Music. 70 Years of the Songs, the Stars and the Stories," Villard Books, Random House; Opryland USA, 1995
Kingsbury, Paul, "Vinyl Hayride: Country Music Album Covers 1947–1989," Country Music Foundation, 2003
Millard, Bob, "Country Music: 70 Years of America's Favorite Music," HarperCollins, New York, 1993
Whitburn, Joel, "Top Country Songs 1944–2005 – 6th Edition." 2005.

Other links
Country Music Association

Country
Country music by year